Manuel Senni (born 11 March 1992 in Cesena) is an Italian former cyclist, who competed as a professional from 2015 to 2021. He competed in four editions of the Giro d'Italia, having entered the race each year between 2016 and 2019.

Major results

2009
 10th Overall Giro di Basilicata
2010
 3rd Overall Giro di Basilicata
1st Stage 3
 10th Overall Giro della Lunigiana
2012
 4th Gran Premio San Giuseppe
 4th Trofeo Banca Popolare di Vicenza
 9th Gran Premio Palio del Recioto
 9th Trofeo Città di San Vendemiano
 10th Giro del Medio Brenta
2013
 5th Trofeo Banca Popolare di Vicenza
 10th GP Capodarco
2014
 3rd Overall Giro della Valle d'Aosta
1st  Points classification
1st Stages 1 & 2
 4th Trofeo Banca Popolare di Vicenza
 4th Gran Premio Palio del Recioto
2017
 1st  Overall Colorado Classic
 3rd Overall Volta a la Comunitat Valenciana
1st  Young rider classification
1st Stage 1 (TTT)
 3rd Giro dell'Appennino
2018
 1st  Mountains classification Tour Poitou-Charentes en Nouvelle-Aquitaine
 9th Overall International Tour of Rhodes

Grand Tour general classification results timeline

References

External links

1992 births
Living people
Italian male cyclists
People from Cesena
Sportspeople from the Province of Forlì-Cesena
Cyclists from Emilia-Romagna